The individual dressage was one of five equestrianism events on the Equestrian at the 1924 Summer Olympics programme. The competition was held on Thursday, 25 July 1924. 24 riders from nine nations competed.

Results

References

Sources
 
 

Dressage